Phillip Edward Chappell (August 18, 1837 – February 23, 1908) was an American politician. He served as the State Treasurer of Missouri from 1881 to 1885.

References

State treasurers of Missouri
Missouri Democrats
1837 births
1908 deaths